Allium subangulatum is a Chinese species of wild onion, native to Gansu, Ningxia and Qinghai Provinces.

Allium subangulatum produces a cluster of narrow bulbs, each up to 10 mm across. Scape is up to 35 cm tall. Leaves are long and very narrow, shorter than the scape and usually less than 1 mm wide. Umbel is hemispheric with many flowers crowded together. Tepals reddish-purple with darker red midvein.

References

subangulatum
Onions
Flora of China
Plants described in 1887